Xiao Jun (3 July 1907 – 22 June 1988), born Liu Honglin, was a Chinese author and intellectual from Linghai, Liaoning, China. Of Manchu ethnicity, Xiao's most famous work in China is his 1934 novel Village in August which gained both popular and critical praise as anti-Japanese literature. He, along with Xiao Hong, is considered one of the most representative authors of the left-wing Northeast Authors Group. The names Xiao Hong and Xiao Jun were chosen by each author so that when put together they would be xiao xiao hongjun (tiny red army).

Early career
In 1925, he entered the Northeast Military Academy which was organized under Zhang Xueliang where he studied law and military affairs. He began writing novels sometime during his studies and in 1929 published the nove Nuo... (.../Coward...) which was highly critical of the warlords tearing apart China. He published several more novels, all of which appeared in the Shengjing Times.

Work with Xiao Hong
In 1932, he left for Harbin, where he began a literary career in earnest. In 1933, he met Xiao Hong with whom he co-authored Bashe (An Arduous Journey) and both published for the first time under their Xiao pseudonyms. In 1934, Xiao Jun and Xiao Hong worked together in Qingdao on the supplement to Qingdao Morning Post and Xiao Jun finished his most well-known work Village in August.

In July 1937, he published the novel illegally and out of his own pocket, since the KMT held to a policy of non-resistance and did not want to incite the Japanese whom Chiang Kai-shek knew were superior militarily and could obliterate China if they wanted. The novel had an immediate impact and cemented his reputation among the literati of the time. This period saw the unleashing of Xiao's creativity with a number of short stories, novellas, essays, and the beginning of his second masterwork Di san dai (Third Generation) which he wrote on and off for nearly twenty years. It depicts China's old feudal society, the era of bourgeois revolution, imperialism, the warlord era, and the realities of Northeastern Chinese society.

Yan'an and Harbin
He fled to Yan'an during the Second World War in June 1940, where he worked with many other famous writers and was active in Yan'an's cultural activities. On December 19, 1940, he began holding a Monthly Meeting of Arts and Literature  which eventually led to publishing the Arts and Literature Monthly which he edited in conjunction with Ding Ling, Shu Qun, and Liu Xuewei.

In 1942, he was the first to speak at the Yan'an Forum after Mao's opening statement.

He returned to Harbin in 1946, where he was chosen to edit and write for the Cultural Gazette, a journal he started under party patronage in 1947 on the anniversary of the May Fourth Movement. His writings quickly drew the ire of many of the top level cadres at Yan'an whom he criticized for their pedantic treatment of the people, equating them one time to clowns who try to hypnotize their gullible audiences. His prestige however gained him a degree of immunity from punitive actions for over a year at which time a number of articles appeared attacking Xiao for his simplistic anti-Japanese nationalism and political immaturity for not engaging socialist class struggle. "Criticism meetings" soon followed, and the Central Committee of the Chinese Communist Party decided to send Xiao to work with coal miners in Fushun, Liaoning.

People's Republic era and death

He began writing again professionally in the 1950s in Beijing. His period of hardship in the mines inspired Wuyue de kuangshan (Mine in May). He also published his letters between himself and Lu Xun and Xiao Hong and finished Di san dai.

His writing came to an end in 1957 when he was labeled a rightist. He was imprisoned during the Cultural Revolution, but rehabilitated in 1979 after which he became active again in literary circles until he died due to health complications in 1988.

See also
Zhang Yumao, literary scholar and expert on Xiao Jun

References

Further reading 

 Lee, Leo. (1973). The Romantic Generation of Chinese Writers. Harvard University Press. . 

Manchu people
Republic of China novelists
Writers from Liaoning
1907 births
1988 deaths
People from Jinzhou
Victims of the Cultural Revolution
20th-century novelists
Chinese male novelists
Burials at Babaoshan Revolutionary Cemetery